is a city tram station on the Takaoka Kidō Line in Takaoka, Toyama, Japan.

Surrounding area
Manyosen Yonejima Depot
Quattroboom Pachinko

Railway stations in Toyama Prefecture